WRAP-LD is a low-power television station in Cleveland, Ohio on channel 16. Formerly carriers of The Box music channel and later MTV2 simulcasts (due to The Box being sold to Viacom), it then carried ACN, It now carries a schedule of full-time paid programming from Corner Store TV.

Digital television
WRAP-LP fell silent on September 6, 2010 and resumed operations on August 31, 2011, although under a very low power output of 70 watts from a facility near Shaker Heights. WRAP-LP currently had a construction permit to build a new digital facility on the WQHS transmission tower in Parma, OH. The station was licensed for digital operation effective December 9, 2021, changing its call sign to WRAP-LD.

References

External links

Brokered programming
RAP-LD
Television channels and stations established in 1992
1992 establishments in Ohio
Low-power television stations in the United States